The Gay Nineties Revue is an American old-time radio musical variety program. It was broadcast on CBS from July 2, 1939, to November 13, 1944. ABC broadcast a television version of the program in 1948–1949.

Format
The Gay Nineties Revue featured music, comedy, and skits typical of the 1890s based in a nightclub setting. The format was one that was used in American nightclubs, such as Club Royale in Detroit and the Rice Hotel's Empire Room in Houston.

Personnel
Joe Howard was the program's host, and Frank Lovejoy played Broadway Harry. Soloists included Beatrice Kay, Lillian Leonard, and Genevieve Rowe. Singing groups included the Elm City Four and the Floradora Girls. John Reed King was the announcer, and Ray Bloch led the orchestra. Al Rinker was the producer.

Spinoffs 
The Gay Nineties Revue produced two spin-offs. Gaslight Gayeties ran on NBC from November 11, 1944, to April 28, 1945, and starred Beatrice Kay. The Beatrice Kay Show ran on Mutual from August 14, 1946, to September 4, 1946.

References

External links

Logs
Log of episodes of The Gay Nineties Revue from Old Time Radio Researchers Group
Log of episodes of The Gay Nineties Revue from radioGOLDINdex

1939 radio programme debuts
1944 radio programme endings
1930s American radio programs
1940s American radio programs
CBS Radio programs
Gay Nineties